Low density lipoprotein receptor-related protein 11 is a protein in humans that is encoded by the LRP11 gene.

References

Further reading 

Genes on human chromosome 6